En decemberdröm (A December Dream") was the Sveriges Television's Christmas calendar in 2005.

Plot 
The series is a fantasy tale where the main character, Bobo, meets tomtar and other folklore creatures.

Selected cast 
 John Jangard as Bobo Larsson, the 11 year old protagonist who suffers a head injury during a football match and falls into a coma, in which he dreams of the underworld.
 Frida Bergesén as Mary Marléne, Bobo's girlfriend who lives in the underworld.
 Christian Zetterberg as Gustav "Gurra", Bobo's best friend and classmate.
 Elisabet Carlsson as Lola Larsson, Bobo's mother and Benke's wife. She was a famous singer until she lost her singing voice when giving birth to Bobo.
 Robin Stegmar as Benke Larsson, Bobo's father and Lola's husband.
 Robert Gustafsson as Chefen, the lisping, molelike boss of the underworld.
 Henric Holmberg as Dorian, the father of Buick and Bentley. Lillefar's son and Daisy's husband.
 Siw Erixon as Daisy, the mother of Buick and Bentley and Dorian's wife.
 Niklas Hjulström as Buick, the son of Dorian and Daisy and Bentley's brother.
 Lisa Linnertorp as Bentley, the daughter of Dorian and Daisy and Buick's sister.
 Aksel Morisse as Ronson, the butler of the Rik och Dum family who reside in the castle.
 Iwar Wiklander as Tant Bölla, an old lady associated with the Rik och Dum family.
 Anette Nääs as Fröken, the teacher of Bobo's class.
 Alexander Karim as Vaktis, a Janitor at Bobo's school.
 Alicia Vikander as Tony, Mary's older sister and the leader of De Läskiga, a local gang who hangs out at the Alvéns shopping mall.
 Daniel Brandt as Zingo, a member of De Läskiga.
 Per-Owe Rehnberg as Pepsi, a member of De Läskiga.
 Jesper Tosavainen as Klubbmannen, a member of De Läskiga.

Video 
The series was released to DVD on 27 October 2006.

References

External links 
 

2005 Swedish television series debuts
2005 Swedish television series endings
Sveriges Television's Christmas calendar